Dick Binyinyuwuy Djarrankuykuy (c. 1928–1982) was a leading Aboriginal artist from the island of Milingimbi off the coast of the Northern Territory of Australia. He belonged to the  Djarrankuykuy clan of the Djambarrpuyngu people. During World War II he was among the group of Aboriginal men enlisted by Squadron Leader Donald Thomson for the Northern Territory Special Reconnaissance Unit to protect Australia's northern shoreline from Japanese invasion. He became an artist after the war, in the 1950s.

Biography 

Binyinyuwuy was born in 1928 in Ramingining, in central Arnhem Land, Australia. He belongs to the Djambarrpuyngu language group. As a young man, he moved to the island of Milingimbi, just off the northern coast of Arnhem Land. The town of Milingimbi was established by the Overseas Methodist Mission in 1923, and later re-established in 1951 after the residents were evacuated during World War II.  This island is very remote, and the community was very conservative.

In 1948, Binyinyuwuy, as part of Charles Mountford's American-Australian Scientific Expedition to Arnhem Land, helped archeologist Frank Setzler excavate a Makassan well. Later, during the war, Binyinyuwuy became part of Donald Thomson's Northern Territory Special Reconnaissance Unit (NTSRU). Binyinyuwuy and a group of other young Yolnu men were thus charged with safeguarding the coast of their home, Arnhem Land, from enemy invaders, like the Japanese army, from 1941 to 1943. The unit was later disbanded as the threat of a Japanese landing in Arnhem Land decreased. No longer a soldier, Binyinyuwuy returned to his life.

In the 1950s, Binyinyuwuy, now a young rebel, was seen raiding shops at the mission station by Ann Wells, wife of Edgar Wells, the mission superintendent. Binyinyuwuy resented the presence of the balanda (white people) on his people's land. Concerned that Binyinyuwuy would continue to raid his stores, Wells approached the community's leaders to ask them how he should proceed. By this time, Binyinyuwuy had already established himself in this Indigenous community as a skilled painter and maker of ceremonial objects. The elders told Wells of his skill, and Wells declared that if Binyinyuwuy gave him one of his bark paintings, he would not be punished for his crimes. Binyinyuwuy agreed to these terms. When Wells saw the painting, he admired it so much that he added young Binyinyuwuy to a list of paid artists providing artworks to the mission station. Thus Binyinyuwuy's career as an artist began. He grew to be an influential artist in his community and abroad, both because of his skill, and because of his high ritual authority. As he grew older, Binyinyuwuy became a central part of ceremonial life in his community, and his works were featured in many different collections at various museums across the globe. He kept making ceremonial objects and paintings until his death in 1982.

Inspired by her father, his daughter Judy Lirrinyin has also become a celebrated artist of her own generation, working through the Milingimbi Arts and Culture.

Career 

Binyinyuwuy had a high ritual authority, which meant his paintings could reflect a diverse range of subject matter. This included the därrpa (king brown snake), the birrkulda (honey), and the wititj (olive python), among many other things.

One of Binyinyuwuy's earlier paintings was called Banumbirr (morning star), and was collected by Charles Mountford during the 1948 AASEAL expedition. He was a guardian of Morning Star ceremony and many of his more important paintings depict Morning Star ceremonial poles.

Binyinyuwuy is known for the elegance of his bark paintings, and his use of warm colours in some of his work. He was recognized alongside other prolific painters in his community, like Tom Djäwa and David Malangi. Today, his work can be found at many important museums in Australia, such as the Art Gallery of New South Wales, as well as the National Museum of Australia. It is partly due to his success that the art industry continues to flourish in Milingimbi to this day.

Collections 

 Art Gallery of New South Wales
 Kluge-Ruhe Aboriginal Art Collection of the University of Virginia
National Gallery of Australia
 National Gallery of Victoria
National Museum of Australia

Significant exhibitions 

 2007: One sun, One moon: Aboriginal Art in Australia. Art Gallery of New South Wales, Sydney, 03 Jul 2007–02 Dec 2007
2017: Art from Milingimbi: Taking Memories Back. Art Gallery of New South Wales, Sydney, 12 Nov 2016–29 Jan 2017.
2019: Reinvigorating the MECA Collection. Charles Darwin University Gallery, Darwin, 28 Mar 2019–20 Jul 2019.

References 

Australian Aboriginal artists
1920s births
1982 deaths
20th-century Australian artists